The National Chinese Orchestra, Taiwan (NCO) is a Chinese orchestra based in Taipei, Taiwan (Republic of China). The ensemble was founded in 1984 as the National Art Academy Experimental Chinese Orchestra. Due to administrative changes, the orchestra was renamed National Experimental Chinese Orchestra in 1990, and National Chinese Orchestra in 2006. It comprises 93 musicians and takes responsibility of collecting, researching, performing, recording, and publishing the traditional music in Taiwan.

Before 2008, the orchestra was run by the Ministry of Education and administrated by the National Taiwan University of Arts. The orchestra is now administrated by the new National Center for Traditional Arts under the Council for Cultural Affairs.

Li Shi-Min was the first principal conductor of the orchestra. In 1999, the orchestra appointed famous conductor and composer Qu Chunquan from Mainland China as principal conductor. After 10 years of direction under Chu, Wen Yi-jen was appointed music director for the 08/09 season, also the first season of the ensemble. The position of music director is currently on call, and conductor Wen Yi-jen is now serving as the principal guest conductor of the orchestra.

Conductors

Li Shi-Min, principal conductor 1988–1999
Qu Chunquan, principal conductor 1999–2008
Wen Yi-jen, music director 2008–2009

External links
 Official website (Chinese)
 Official website (English) 

Taiwanese orchestras
Chinese orchestras
Musical groups established in 1984
1984 establishments in Taiwan